The women's doubles competition at the 2023 FIL World Luge Championships was held on 28 January 2023.

Results
The first run was held at 09:10 and the second run at 10:46.

References

Women's doubles'